Goliador Chișinău is a Moldovan women's football club, based in Chișinău.

The team plays in the country's top level league. The team has won the double in 2010–11 winning the championship and the Moldovan Women's Cup. It debuted in Europe in the 2011–12 UEFA Women's Champions League qualifying round. Goliador though lost all their matches without scoring a goal.

The team won their second championship title in 2012–13 overtaking FC Noroc on the last matchday. A third title was won in 2014.

European matches
The team is still looking to score their first goal in three seasons.

References

External links
UEFA profile

Football clubs in Chișinău
Women's football clubs in Moldova